Diactora is a genus of moths belonging to the subfamily Tortricinae of the family Tortricidae.

Species
Diactora oxymorpha Diakonoff, 1960

See also
List of Tortricidae genera

References

 Diakonoff, A. (1960). Verhandelingen der Koninklijke Nederlandse Akademie van Wetenschappen. (2) 53 (2): 202.
 Brown, John W. (2005). World Catalogue of Insects. 5.

External links
Tortricid.net

Archipini
Tortricidae genera